The year 579 BC was a year of the pre-Julian Roman calendar. In the Roman Empire, it was known as year 175 Ab urbe condita . The denomination 579 BC for this year has been used since the early medieval period, when the Anno Domini calendar era became the prevalent method in Europe for naming years.

Events
 Servius Tullius succeeds Lucius Tarquinius Priscus as king of Rome upon the latter's assassination. (traditional date)

Births

Deaths
 Lucius Tarquinius Priscus, fifth king of Rome

References